Hollyoaks is a British television soap opera that was first broadcast on 23 October 1995. The following is a list of characters that appeared or will appear in the serial in 2014, by order of first appearance. All characters are introduced by the show's executive producer Bryan Kirkwood. Hilton Cunningham, the son of Cindy Cunningham (Stephanie Waring) and Doctor Browning (Joseph Thompson), was born prematurely on 11 February. Doctor Browning's secret son Alex (Ojan Genc) and Blessing Chambers (Modupe Adeyeye) both made their first appearances in February, while Robbie (Charlie Wernham) and Jason Roscoe's (Alfie Browne-Sykes) estranged father, Rick Spencer (Victor Gardner), arrived in May. June saw the arrivals of Sienna Blake's (Anna Passey) long lost daughter Nico Blake (Persephone Swales-Dawson) and Cameron Campbell (Cameron Moore), Peri Lomax's (Ruby O'Donnell) estranged father and a new love interest for Peri's mother, Leela Lomax (Kirsty-Leigh Porter). Big Bob (Vincent Ebrahim) made his first appearance in August, while Dennis Savage's (Joe Tracini) father, Charles S'avage (Andrew Greenough), Lindsey Butterfield's (Sophie Austin) sister, Kim (Daisy Wood-Davis), and Cameron's brother Lockie Campbell (Nick Rhys) all arrived in October. Myra McQueen's (Nicole Barber-Lane) nieces Celine (Sarah George) and Porsche McQueen (Twinnie Lee Moore) arrived in November. Cameron's enemy, Shane (Jody Latham), also made a number of appearances in November.

Alex Browning

Alex Browning, played by Ojan Genc, made his first screen appearance on 13 February 2014. The character and Genc's casting were announced on 12 January 2014 via the Daily Star. Alex is the son of Dr. Paul Browning (Joseph Thompson), a character who last appeared on Hollyoaks in 2013 after being murdered following an altercation with Mercedes McQueen (Jennifer Metcalfe). Alex will arrive in the village hoping to avenge his father's death and becomes suspicious of Mercedes. He has been billed as having "obvious similarities" to Doctor Browning which leaves Mercedes feeling "unsettled".

When Mercedes arrives at Helen's house, after her friend Cindy Cunningham (Stephanie Waring) was impregnated by Doctor Browning and her son, Hilton, needs a bone marrow transplant, his son Alex opens the door. She asks if Helen is at the house, and Alex presumes that she is a cleaner. He reveals that he has a girlfriend, is studying Biology and Physics at university and becomes attracted to her. After they have sex, Mercedes decides to go and he soon uncovers that Mercedes is his stepmother. He confronts her about his father's disappearance, but she walks out of the house. Alex returns and starts to investigate his father's death and becomes suspicious of Mercedes. He torments her throughout his stay and finds out that Mercedes' friend Cindy's son, Hilton, is his half-brother. He becomes a godfather to Hilton and is found out to be a match. Alex agrees to do the transplant to save his brother and leaves later that day. Cindy is grateful and tells him that he can visit Hilton anytime, much to Mercedes' disappointment.

Hilton Cunningham

Hilton Cunningham is the son of Cindy Cunningham (Stephanie Waring) and Dr. Paul Browning (Joseph Thompson). He is born three months prematurely and suffers from severe combined immunodeficiency, meaning he needs a bone marrow transplant. Doctor Browning is killed by his wife Mercedes McQueen (Jennifer Metcalfe). Cindy and Lindsey Butterfield (Sophie Austin) helped to dispose of the corpse. Hilton is later christened in the hospital, with Mercedes, Lindsey and Cindy's daughter Holly Cunningham (Amanda Clapham) as his godmothers and Doctor Browning's son Alex Browning (Ojan Genc) as his godfather.

Blessing Chambers

Blessing Chambers (formerly known as Tyson Delaney), played by Modupe Adeyeye, made her first screen appearance on 21 February 2014. The character and casting was announced on 5 February 2014. Blessing is a glass collector, working at a strip club which is visited by Dennis Savage (Joe Tracini). Dennis puts Blessing's job and flat in jeopardy when he gets her into trouble with her boss. The character was billed as being "strong and colourful" and not having had a lot of luck in the past. Her surname has been shown as "Chamber" and "Chambers" on the official site. In May it was revealed that Blessing is a transgender woman.

Blessing meets Dennis at a strip club. Her behaviour towards him causes her manager to fire her. Dennis gives Blessing a place to stay as an apology. The pair become close and Dennis develops an attraction to her. But his constant mistrust of her begins to cause problems. Blessing ruins George Smith's (Steven Roberts) laptop and he steals her credit card to pay for a new one. The use of the card attracts a private investigator who threatens Blessing and blackmails her in exchange for his silence. Blessing is arrested for using the card but is released without charge. Dennis and Blessing decide to begin a relationship. She then tells Tony Hutchinson (Nick Pickard) that she is a transgender woman and was born "Tyson Delaney". He urges her to be honest with Dennis but when she does he is upset and warns Blessing to keep away. Blessing's mother Petula Delaney (Jo Martin) arrives looking for her son so Blessing hides from her fearing rejection. She then gets drunk with Finn O'Connor (Keith Rice) and kisses him. When Finn realises she has male genitals he attacks her and records the ordeal. Tony incorrectly assumes Dennis is behind the attack but discovers that Finn is the culprit and reports him to the police, but Finn's stepmother Diane (Alex Fletcher) destroys the evidence. Blessing then decides to stand for college president against Tegan Lomax (Jessica Ellis) and receives support from Dennis. Blessing and Dennis later help Maxine Minniver (Nikki Sanderson) escape her abusive relationship with Patrick Blake (Jeremy Sheffield). Blessing departed Hollyoaks with Dennis in November 2014. In 2018, it is revealed that Dennis and Blessing have broken up.

Rick Spencer

Rick Spencer, played by Victor Gardener, made his first screen appearance on 13 May 2014. The character and casting was announced on 17 April 2014. Rick is a bar owner, who employs Holly Cunningham (Amanda Clapham), before later moving to the village where several characters will be shocked to see him. Jason Roscoe (Alfie Browne-Sykes) sees him in the bar and collapses. When in hospital, he reveals to girlfriend Holly that Rick is his father. Rick is also the father of Robbie Roscoe (Charlie Wernham). On New Year's Eve 2015, Nancy Osborne (Jessica Fox) lies to Robbie and tells him that Rick has been supplying her pain killers, feeding her addiction to them. At the same time at the Roscoe household Rick is forcing Jason to eat food. When Holly arrives she throws Rick out. Outside the house Robbie confronts Rick and they fight but Joe Roscoe (Ayden Callaghan) comes out and punches Rick. Rick hits his head on the ground and is knocked out. At the hospital Rick is in a critical but stable condition. When he is alone an unknown person enters the room and injects him with potassium chloride. When Jason arrives to visit him his heart stops and despite attempts to revive him he dies. Joe is later arrested for his murder. He reappeared in a flashback episode on 23 October 2015 when the real serial killer is revealed to be Lindsey Roscoe (Sophie Austin).

Nico Blake

Nico Blake, played by Persephone Swales-Dawson, made her first appearance on 6 June 2014. The character and casting was announced on 20 May 2014. Daniel Kilkelly from Digital Spy reported that Nico arrives in Hollyoaks and meets Dodger Savage (Danny Mac). He takes pity on her and gives her food. A show spokesperson added "Is this girl just a passing tearaway teenager? Or could there perhaps be something more?" It was soon announced that Nico is the long-lost daughter of Sienna Blake (Anna Passey). But Patrick Blake (Jeremy Sheffield) intervenes to ruin Nico and Sienna's chances of becoming acquainted. His scams include paying Nico's adoptive mother Denise (Janet Bamford) to trick Sienna into believing someone else is her daughter. When Nico tells Sienna that she is her daughter she is dismissed as a liar. This prompts Nico to begin a revenge campaign. Nico was killed off on 1 November 2016 after a burning maze collapsed with her in it. However, in a shocking twist airing on 15 May 2018, Nico was revealed to have survived the fire, and the body identified was in fact someone elso who looked like Nico.

Cameron Campbell

Cameron Campbell, played by Cameron Moore, made his first appearance on 20 June 2014. The character and casting was announced on 23 April 2014. Cameron arrived in the village having recently been released from prison, and he has a dangerous past that has had implications for many characters. He was also introduced as a love interest for Leela Lomax (Kirsty-Leigh Porter) and the father of Peri Lomax (Ruby O'Donnell). In January 2017, it was revealed that Cameron would be leaving the show, with Moore's final scenes airing on 26 January 2017.

Cameron was first mentioned by Leela saying she had found his prison and that she was going to talk to him. It is then revealed that he was serving time for a crime he did not commit because Leela's mother Sam Lomax (Lizzie Roper) set him up. Sam then visited him in prison before Leela ordering him not to see her otherwise she'll make sure that he will do more time. Cameron reluctantly agrees but then gets his parole moved up. Later when Sam is getting off work Cameron is seen in the back of her car and forces her to drive away from the village and scares her as revenge for what she did to him. He then reveals that he's sticking around in the village.

He gets a job as co-chef in The Hutch and befriends Leela's half-brother Ste Hay (Kieron Richardson) much to the horror of Sam and Danny (Stephen Billington). Cameron later confronts Leela about Peri asking if she's his daughter. Leela denies it at first but later tells him the truth. Terrified of Peri finding out the truth, Sam and Danny arrange to take her and their other daughter Tegan Lomax (Jessica Ellis) to New Zealand. Peri becomes depressed at this and drinks a whole bottle of wine, and she is found by Cameron, who she moans to about not wanting to leave. Later angry that Cameron's the reason their leaving, Ste confronts him, but accidentally tells Cameron their leaving. Cameron then tells Leela what Peri told him about not wanting to leave, and they confront Sam and Danny, revealing to Peri that they are her parents, much to the shock of Tegan, Ste and Peri. When Peri later goes missing Cameron goes out in the van looking for her, and accidentally smashes into Sam and Danny's car, killing them. He then flees the scene. He is present at the Lomax house the next day when Leela, Tegan, Ste and Ziggy Roscoe (Fabrizio Santino) learn of their deaths and goes with Leela to identify their bodies. Later he supports Peri when she believes her brain tumor has returned; but it's just a false alarm. He then smashes Sam's wreath just before the funeral, and strikes a deal with Freddie Roscoe (Charlie Clapham) to plant evidence in Sam's things; including a false confession saying she killed Fraser Black (Jesse Birdsall). When Peri is furious that Leela and Tegan believe the note, she moves in with Cameron. Cameron and Ziggy later fall out over Leela, Cameron sets him up by having him drive out to the van that killed Sam and Danny, realizing what it is Ziggy tries to burn it but is arrested by police.

During the hospital siege, Cameron sticks with Leela and tries to get into the lift to rescue Tegan and Ziggy but the lift shaft falls, much to their horror. He then protects Leela from Big Bob (Vincent Ebrahim) deflecting the bullet he shot at her back at him, killing him. When his brother Lockie Campbell (Nick Rhys) arrives in the village, he reveals to Cameron that he's engaged, and asks him to be his best man. After the wedding train crashes, Cameron helps rescue Phoebe McQueen (Mandip Gill) from the wreckage and gets the doors open allowing the passengers to escape. Cameron then finds out from Ziggy that Tegan has cancer, so he supports her, encouraging her to tell Leela the truth. Leela then admits she has feelings for him and they begin a relationship much to Peri's delight. When the Lomaxes fall behind with their bills, Cameron breaks into The Dog to get money for them and he narrowly avoids being caught. In January 2015, he reads a text from Peri's mobile phone from her boyfriend Tom Cunningham (Ellis Hollins) and correctly assumes that they had sex. When he confronts them about it at school, they lie but a humiliated Peri stows away with Tegan and Ziggy as they prepare to go on holiday. Ziggy then phones Cameron and Leela and they go to collect her. While there Cameron eats soup laced with magic mushrooms and accidentally reveals to Leela that he killed Sam and Danny. Leela tries to call the police but she changes her mind and forces him to leave the village instead.

Cameron then returns weeks later when Lockie needs to raise money. He then reveals to Lockie that he killed Sam and Danny, and helps him raise the money by robbing their mother's old boyfriend. Upon his return he learns about Peri's pregnancy and Leela lets him stay for her sake. On Leela and Ziggy's wedding day he kidnaps Leela and she reveals she can never love him for what he's done – unaware that the wedding camera has recorded the whole thing. Cameron eventually lets Leela go, but is blackmailed by Tom who has seen the footage. Cameron convinces Tom to keep quiet as it would destroy Peri if she found out. Cameron starts a relationship with Celine McQueen (Sarah George) after he helps her rob a house to raise money. He then supports her when her boss Dr. Charles S'avage (Andrew Greenough) finds out the truth, but uncovers the truth about him being a fraud and strikes a deal with him: forget what Celine did and he will not tell anybody about his secret. Dr. S'avage agrees and Cameron uses the money he raised from the house to finance a new restaurant after Lockie caused him to lose his job. Tom later blackmails Cameron to stop Peri having their child be adopted, but Cameron refuses to do so. Tom then uploads the video of what Cameron did to the student-teacher messaging board, but changes his mind at the last minute. He forgets to however delete the video and it is accidentally sent by Ste and Harry Thompson (Parry Glasspool). Peri goes into labour after hearing the confession and Cameron, Leela and Tom help her deliver her daughter, Steph. Peri then calls the police on Cameron. Leela says she can help him run but Cameron refuses, and apologises to Peri and Celine and tells them he loves them, and asks Tom to look after Peri and Steph before handing himself into the police.

Cameron is found not guilty after Leela gives a positive character portrayal to the jury. Tegan, Peri, Ziggy and Ste are furious and disown Leela as they believe she still has feelings for Cameron after everything he has done. In December 2015, Leela and Peri decide to leave the village after Leela discovers that Ziggy and Tegan have feelings for one another. Cameron is furious as he does not know where they have gone and ends his relationship with Celine when she lies that Peri has contacted her. After Leela collects Peri from the village a few weeks later, she tells Cameron that he will never see his daughter again. This results in Cameron confessing to Lockie that he killed Sam and Danny on purpose and will kill Leela for keeping him away from Peri. After following Ziggy to Peri and Leela's new flat, he breaks in, turns all the gas on and locks all the doors while Leela is asleep and Peri is out. When Ziggy drops a present off for Peri later, he wakes Leela and she realises that there is a gas leak, so Ziggy breaks the door down and the pair escape as the building explodes; however, Ziggy hits his head as he and Leela are blown away by the explosion. He later dies from his injuries, leaving Tegan heartbroken.

In 2016, after Ste moves back in with his family, Cameron resents his presence and gets him addicted to crystal meth, which he finds very difficult to overcome. Disgusted by Ste, Leela and Tegan ask him to leave, so he moves in with Harry and his father Tony Hutchinson (Nick Pickard), much to Cameron's delight. It later transpires that Cameron murdered Lockie after he discovered that Cameron caused the explosion that killed Ziggy, and this secret comes under threat by the arrival of his cousin, Courtney Campbell (Amy Conachan), who is desperate to find out where Lockie is. Cameron continues to lie to those he loves, including telling Courtney that he has already had Lockie cremated. Cameron is furious when he discovers that Peri's best friend, Nico Blake (Persephone Swales-Dawson) has become obsessed with her and held her hostage, and so at the "Halloween Spooktacular" festival, Cameron sets fire to the wooden maze where Nico and her mother, Sienna Blake (Anna Passey) are. The building is engulfed by flames, and Sienna is rescued, despite her pleas for Nico to be saved. Nico is then killed when the entire structure collapses on her, leaving Sienna distraught. Elsewhere, Joe Roscoe (Ayden Callaghan) and Mercedes McQueen (Jennifer Metcalfe) are trapped on a ferris wheel, and after Mercedes is saved, an explosion caused by the fire started by Cameron sees Joe fall from the ferris wheel, and later dying in hospital. Cameron later discovers that Celine has footage of him setting the maze on fire, but after overhearing Celine confessing to Tegan that she attempted to murder her stepfather Pete Buchanan (Kai Owen), Cameron blackmails Celine into keeping quiet.

Cameron begins to panic when Celine threatens to confess to the police the truth about the fire. He confronts Celine before luring her into an abandoned shed where he holds Celine hostage. Later, Cameron visits Celine where she begs him to release her, promising that she will keep quiet about the fire and that she can live with the guilt. Cameron visits Celine's boyfriend, Jesse Donovan (Luke Jerdy), and, believing Jesse to be totally oblivious to the person responsible for causing the fire, returns to Celine with the possible intention of releasing her. However, on the way to the shack, Cameron intercepts a voice message from Jesse to Celine making him realise that Jesse knows more than he was letting on. Cameron confronts Celine and tearfully tells her that he has no other way to keep her silence but to kill her, promising to make it as quick as possible before strangling her to death, and dumping her corpse in the lake. On Cameron's wedding day to Leela, she gives birth prematurely and the baby is placed in an incubator to help him breathe. Leela names the baby Daniel, after her father Danny. Cameron notices a bruise on the baby and verbally attacks the staff, believing them to be abusing Daniel but it transpires to be a Mongolian blue spot, which is common in mixed race babies. Leela then reveals to Cameron that Daniel is not his son. Cameron then gives Leela an ultimatum: him or Daniel. Leela subsequently chooses Daniel, so Cameron leaves.

Weeks later, Cameron returns to the village and convinces Peri to lure Leela to the cabin, so that they can "reunite". He also kidnaps Zack Loveday (Duayne Boachie), believing him to be Daniel's father, unaware that Daniel's biological father is actually Louis Loveday (Karl Collins), Zack's father. Cameron meets Leela at the cabin, and plots to murder her for cheating on him. Meanwhile, Courtney, Tegan and Peri go to the river, where Tegan and Courtney find a dead body, which transpires to be Celine's. Cameron hears them screaming, so he locks them in a nearby shack, while hinting to Leela and Peri that he has murdered them. Cameron then holds Leela and Peri hostage and confesses to his murder. He starts setting fire to the cabin so that the three of them can die together, but they are saved by Ste and Ryan Knight (Duncan James). After overpowering Ste, Cameron chases after Leela and Peri in the woods, where he is hit by a campervan driven by Mac Nightingale (David Easter) and Lisa Loveday (Rachel Adedeji). Lisa attempts to help Cameron, but Mac convinces her to leave him. Cameron is then arrested for committing seven murders, however is rushed to hospital for his injuries sustained by the hit-and-run. Courtney visits Cameron in hospital and allows him to see Peri, but only if he gives Zack's location. After Courtney refuses to let him see Peri, Cameron blackmails Lisa, forcing her convince Peri to visit in him prison. Meanwhile, Mac disposes of the campervan. Peri visits him and he begs her to stay in touch, but she refuses and cuts all ties with Cameron before leaving. In February 2017, Leela, Tegan, Courtney and Zack are informed that Cameron has been sentenced to life imprisonment for his crimes.

Two years later, Leela and Peri decide to visit him and later informs to Courtney that she forgives him for what he has done.

Big Bob
Robert "Big Bob" Gupta, played by Vincent Ebrahim, made his first on screen appearance on 8 August 2014. The character and casting was announced on 4 July 2014. Big Bob is set to cause trouble for Trevor Royle (Greg Wood) and Grace Black (Tamara Wall) after Trevor is released from prison. Big Bob wants a favour from Trevor, after he helped protect John Paul McQueen (James Sutton).

After failing a drugs raid in a hospital with Freddie Roscoe (Charlie Clapham), Big Bob holds several characters, including Freddie, Grace, Lindsey Butterfield (Sophie Austin), Leela Lomax (Kirsty-Leigh Porter), Cameron Campbell (Cameron Moore), Esther Bloom (Jazmine Franks), Dr. Charles S'avage (Andrew Greenough) and Kim Butterfield (Daisy Wood-Davis) hostage. He shoots Freddie after he tries to act against him and then refuses to let him have treatment. Big Bob is shot dead on 9 October 2014 at the raid during a scuffle with Cameron, who tries to wrestle the gun from him.

Kim Butterfield

Kim Butterfield, played by Daisy Wood-Davis, made her first on-screen appearance on 7 October 2014. The character and Wood-Davis' casting were announced on 23 September 2014. She was introduced as the younger sister of established character Lindsey Butterfield (Sophie Austin). Kim was billed as a "volatile character" who would create trouble for the show's Roscoe family. The casting announcement also revealed the character would quickly become involved in a hostage storyline.

Dr. Charles S'avage

Dr. Charles S'avage, played by Andrew Greenough, made his first appearance on 7 June 2014 The character and casting was announced on 11 March 2014. Dr. S'avage is Dennis Savage's (Joe Tracini) father, and Dirk Savage's (David Kennedy) brother. Dr. S'avage is estranged from Dennis after leaving him to pursue his medical career and has been billed as pompous, as well as having changed his surname to escape from his roots. Dr. S'avage takes charge of a young team of doctors who include Kim Butterfield (Daisy Wood-Davis), Tegan Lomax (Jessica Ellis), Celine McQueen (Sarah George) and other newcomers. Dr. S'avage's introductory storyline saw him taken hostage by Big Bob (Vincent Ebrahim). Dr. S'avage died during the episode that aired on 20 October 2015 when, after discovering the Gloved Hand Killer's identity, he was killed by them. His exit was not announced prior to the episode's airing, making it a surprise for viewers.

Dr. S'avage is first mentioned by his son Dennis, and informs his cousin Will Savage (James Atherton) of how his father left him with Dirk to pursue his medical career at the time, when he was kidnapped by Will. One year later, Dr. S'avage first appears talking to Kim and it is revealed he has recently been hired to work at Dee Valley Hospital. During the hospital siege he tries to stand up to Big Bob when Freddie Roscoe (Charlie Clapham) is shot, but he was overpowered. He then promises to help Lindsey Butterfield (Sophie Austin) get her job back. It is then revealed that he is the father of Dennis who he left in his brother, Dirk's, care when Dennis was a child so he could work abroad. Dennis and Dr. S'avage have a hard time reconciling, especially when Dr. S'avage disapproves of Dennis' transgender girlfriend Blessing Chambers (Modupe Adeyeye). Dr. S'avage then stops Dennis after he threatens to blow up Trevor Royle's (Greg Wood) flat in revenge for Trevor killing his wife, Leanne Holiday (Jessica Forrest), one year prior.

Dr. S'avage then reveals to Tegan that the reason her daughter Rose Lomax's blood transfusion did not work was because Rose was a different blood type than what Tegan was told at her birth, meaning Rose is not her biological daughter. He then informs Tegan that her cancer treatment has not worked and to Tony Hutchinson (Nick Pickard) that his cancer treatment has made him infertile. After the baby swap dilemma comes to light, the midwife who switched them, Mariam Andrews (Helen Lederer), is revealed to be Dr. S'avage's ex-wife. Mariam then blackmails Dr. S'avage into helping her, threatening to reveal a secret of his if he does not. Dr. S'avage then places Mariam in a mental ward which is witnessed by Sienna Blake (Anna Passey). Sienna then gets close to Mariam to try and uncover his secret, and Dr. S'avage, panicking, promises to get her out. Dr. S'avage is angry at his nephew Will for kidnapping Dennis two years prior, and also supports Dirk when he reveals he is being blackmailed over letting his son Will die, but Dr. S'avage tells him he has nothing to feel guilty about. He also helps him set up traps to catch the blackmailer, who is later revealed to be Robbie Roscoe (Charlie Wernham).

Sienna and Dr. S'avage grow closer over the following weeks, which a newly released Mariam is jealous about so she reveals Dr. S'avage's secret: he never fully qualified as a doctor. This panics Sienna as he is treating her daughter, Nico Blake (Persephone Swales-Dawson), who has a kidney infection. Dr. S'avage, however, assures her that he has never miss-diagnosed a patient and that if the truth comes out she may be deemed fit to stand trial and could end up in prison. When Mariam accuses him of killing patients, he denies it and Sienna helps destroy the evidence of him not qualifying as a doctor. When Mariam is found dead in his office after being murdered by the Gloved Hand Killer, Sienna gives him an alibi. A few weeks later, Dr. S'avage finds Sienna suffering an allergic reaction from a bee sting after Nico abandoned her and encourages Sienna to report Nico to Social Services as she needs help. Sienna agrees but later regrets her decision and has an argument with Dr. S'avage about it, before breaking down in tears. Dr. S'avage comforts her and they share a kiss. Sienna tells him later that she just sees him as a father figure, devastating him. Reenie McQueen (Zöe Lucker) then starts flirting with him to get his money, but Dr. S'avage does not believe Sienna when she tells him. After Sienna pushes Reenie down the city stairs, Dr. S'avage helps her cover it up after she admits she needed him by blackmailing Reenie over her using his credit card. He then treats Sienna's wounds after Reenie attacks her and promises to mend her wicker make of the Titanic, which Reenie also destroyed.

In August 2015, Dr. S'avage discovers that Nico murdered Carly Bradley (Sophie Wise) while protecting Sienna and tries to cover it up, but the police are called by Celine. He panics when Nico is arrested, but she is later released. He also treats Leela Lomax (Kirsty-Leigh Porter) after a car explosion and is seen outside when the Gloved Hand Killer murdered Dylan Jenkins (James Fletcher), ruling him out as a suspect. He then becomes suspicious of Dylan's death and when Cindy Cunningham (Stephanie Waring) finds the Gloved Hand Killer's locker with photos of their victims, she shares what she found with Dr. S'avage. Dr. S'avage then finds a strand of hair in the locker and orders all his staff to take a drug test in an attempt to find out who it is. However, Celine panics as she is using hospital appetite suppressants to get thin and she switches her DNA sample in order to throw the scent off her. Dr. S'avage places a camera in the drugs locker to try and catch the killer, but it fails. Later, when Ashley Davidson (Kierston Wareing) is murdered by the Gloved Hand Killer, Dr. S'avage uses the CCTV camera he placed in Ashley's room and succeedingly catches the killer. But, when advancing into the Hollyoaks Pride Festival, he calls Cindy to tell her who the killer is, unaware that the killer is behind him, armed with a syringe. Dr. S'avage is then injured when he is struck by a falling beam after Trevor shot it down by accident. In the confusion, the killer reaches Dr. S'avage and fatally injects him with a large dose of potassium chloride, which was witnessed by young Charlie Dean (Charlie Behan). Dr. S'avage descends into cardiac arrest and is rushed to hospital, but dies when being resuscitated. Dirk is devastated by this as they always argued with each other. However, Cindy is adamant that the Gloved Hand Killer murdered him. Lindsey is later revealed as the killer soon after Dr. S'avage's death.

Myra-Pocahontas Savage-McQueen

Myra-Pocahontas Regina Madonna Savage-McQueen is a daughter of Dodger Savage (Danny Mac) and Theresa McQueen (Jorgie Porter) and half-sister of Nico Blake (Persephone Swales-Dawson) and Kathleen-Angel McQueen (Nieve Grandison). She was named after Theresa's aunt, Myra McQueen (Nicole Barber-Lane). Theresa was pregnant by Dodger at the time when she attempted to run  till she is arrested for the murder of Kathleen-Angel's father, Calvin Valentine (Ricky Whittle), four years prior. Theresa pretended to be in labour in order to escape after discovering that her cousin and Calvin's wife, Carmel Valentine (Gemma Merna), had been tricked by Calvin's brother Sonny Valentine (Aaron Fontaine) for Theresa nearly getting caught back in January 2014. Theresa escapes with the help of Myra and Mercedes McQueen (Jennifer Metcalfe), and runs away again with Kathleen-Angel. The following month, the police finally uncover Sonny's trick and are forced to drop the charges against Theresa due to corrupted evidence and Theresa gives birth to Myra-Pocahontas. A month later, Dodger decided to raise Myra-Pocahontas alongside Kathleen-Angel, despite discovering Nico was his daughter with his sister Sienna Blake (Anna Passey).

In 2015, Dodger left the village following a last showdown with his half-brother Will Savage (James Atherton), leaving Theresa to raise Kathleen-Angel and Myra-Pocahontas as a single mother. In January 2016, Dodger's father Patrick Blake (Jeremy Sheffield) is murdered by Nico, after he sent a video to Sienna's boyfriend Ben Bradley (Ben Richards) proving that Nico killed Ben's daughter, Carly Bradley (Sophie Wise). In March 2016, Myra-Pocahontas leaves Hollyoaks village with Theresa and Kathleen-Angel to live in Spain.

In 2018, Liberty Savage (Jessamy Stoddart) call Theresa to inform to Myra-Pocahontas about her grandfather Dirk (David Kennedy) was killed, however she could not attend and bring her into his funeral due to flight conflicts. She later inform that Dodger is now living with her and was a good father to their daughter especially a father figure to Kathleen-Angel.

Lockie Campbell

Lachlan "Lockie" Campbell, played by Nick Rhys, made his first on-screen appearance on 24 October 2014. The character and casting was announced on 26 August 2014. Lockie is the brother of Cameron Campbell (Cameron Moore).

On his arrival, Lockie meets Cameron's ex-girlfriend Leela Lomax (Kirsty-Leigh Porter) in a nightclub, whom he takes a shine to, and kisses her. He then sells drugs to Leela's half-brother Ste Hay (Kieron Richardson), telling him to pay him back in kind, which his boyfriend John Paul McQueen (James Sutton) overhears. When Ste does not, Lockie wants the drugs back, but unknown to him Ste has added drain cleaner to the drugs before he returned them. Lockie asks John Paul to go for a drink and offers him the drugs that Ste had mixed with the lethal liquid. After accepting and taking the tainted drugs, Ste finds John Paul at The Loft, but John Paul collapses. When he returns home out of hospital, Ste decides to go to rehab to get his life back on track, and Lockie uses the opportunity to tell him that Ste was responsible for his ordeal. Lockie transpires to be bisexual when John Paul realises Lockie has an attraction to him. However, he is shocked when Lockie is revealed to be engaged to John Paul's cousin, Porsche McQueen (Twinnie Lee Moore). John Paul walks Porsche down the aisle on the wedding day, but decides to tell her that he thinks Lockie is attracted him. When he does, Porsche is shocked, but Lockie explains and she still decides to go ahead with the wedding. They marry, but disaster strikes during the celebrations, the party train derails after hitting Sienna Blake's (Anna Passey) car stuck on the tracks, killing Porsche's cousin Carmel Valentine (Gemma Merna).

In early 2015, Lockie has sex with Diane Hutchinson (Alex Fletcher) and also cheats on Porsche with John Paul and her cousin Mercedes McQueen (Jennifer Metcalfe). Months later, Lockie learns that Mercedes is pregnant when he finds her baby scan, shortly before Porsche discovers Lockie has been cheating with Mercedes and John Paul after found John Paul in the closet, half-naked. Lockie believes he is father of Mercedes' baby but John Paul informs Lockie that Mercedes was already pregnant with Joe Roscoe's (Ayden Callaghan) child before they started an affair. Porsche then demands a divorce. On Christmas Eve 2015, Lockie is kidnapped by Cameron after he told him that he was going to tell Leela that he intended to kill her and her parents Danny (Stephen Billington) and Sam Lomax (Lizzie Roper). He later discovers from Cameron that Porsche has left the village, later, Cameron sees Lockie about to leave town and speeds after him in his car, Lockie's fate is left unknown. Lockie returned in a flashback in April 2016. Later, in May 2016, Cameron accidentally let it slip to Ste that he killed Lockie, whilst scattering their father's ashes. This is confirmed a flash-back which shows Cameron dumping a body in the lake. Viewers then see ID confirming that the body Cameron dumped, was in fact Lockie's.

Porsche McQueen

Porsche McQueen (also known as Porsche Campbell), played by Twinnie Lee Moore, made her first on screen appearance on 4 November 2014. The basis of the character was announced on 3 May 2014, whilst the character name and casting was announced on 26 August 2014. Porsche has been billed as "racier than her four-wheeled namesake" Mercedes, but is fiercely loyal and has a "good moral compass".

On 1 October 2015, it was announced that after less than a year in the role as Porsche, Moore had chosen to leave the show at the end of her contract. Details and timings of Porsche's exit is being kept under wraps. Porsche's storylines in her time on the show included her failed marriage to Lockie after his numerous affairs and a child abuse storyline which saw her reveal stepfather Pete had abused her age 15. Of her time on the show Moore said: "I have had a fantastic time at Hollyoaks and I have loved playing Porsche. Coming in for a big McQueen wedding and being part of the train crash stunt last year was so exciting and a brilliant entrance for a new character." She continued to state recent months on-screen, "I was then honoured to work with the NSPCC on the child abuse storyline, which has been so important to me personally and professionally. There is more to come for Porsche before my exit. I will miss everyone at Hollyoaks but am also looking forward to future projects."

Her sister, Celine (Sarah George) arrives just in time for her wedding to Lockie Campbell (Nick Rhys), which takes place on a party train organised for the reception. At the wedding, best man John Paul McQueen (James Sutton) reveals that Lockie is attracted to him, but Porsche forgives him and the wedding goes ahead. Shortly after the marriage during the celebrations, the train derails when it hits Sienna Blake's (Anna Passey) car stuck on the tracks, killing her cousin Carmel Valentine (Gemma Merna). When Carmel's body is brought to the McQueens, Porsche steals her ring and allows Mercedes McQueen (Jennifer Metcalfe) to get the blame. Whilst attending Carmel's funeral she is insulted by Mercedes. Feeling guilty about allowing Mercedes to get the blame she tells the truth and guesses that Carmel would have given the ring to her but just as the McQueens head to tell Mercedes how sorry they are unknown to them Mercedes is being murdered by Freddie Roscoe (Charlie Clapham) and he manages to clear her body just in time as the McQueens walk in. Porsche along with the McQueens become suspicious about Mercedes' disappearance and they believe she has gone to Alicante. They are shocked when they hear Mercedes has been murdered. Porsche then agrees to take part in the televised reconstruction of Mercedes' death, playing Mercedes. Porsche and Lockie argue with Nana McQueen (Diane Langton) over what goes on in the house and Nana tells Porsche to look for a job. She and Lockie ask Grace Black (Tamara Wall) and Trevor Royle (Greg Wood) for a job and Grace tells them to do a competition and Porsche wins. Whilst having a sisterly talk with Grace she goes to the freezer to get a drink and is locked in by Trevor's long-lost son Dylan Jenkins (James Fletcher). Trevor and Grace find her unconscious and the ambulance rush her to the hospital. She decides to let Dylan off. Porsche is delighted when her sister Cleo McQueen (Nadine Rose Mulkerrin) arrives from France in January 2015. Porsche is also suspicious when Lockie becomes secret but it she realises that he is selling drugs unaware that Lockie once sold drugs to her cousin John Paul which spiked him. Due to the stress Lockie stays a night with Diane Hutchinson (Alex Fletcher) unaware to Porsche. But Porsche eventually learns the truth when she decorates Sinead's room. Later she confronts Sinead but realises Diane slept with Lockie. After exchanging heated words, Diane is pushed out of a window however she does not die.

On 8 April 2015, it was announced that an upcoming storyline would see Porsche involved in a child sexual abuse storyline. In scenes airing on 13 April 2015, Porsche would reveal to Phoebe McQueen (Mandip Gill), who was previously suffered sexual abuse herself, that her mother Reenie McQueen's (Zöe Lucker) boyfriend, Pete Buchanan (later announced to be played by Torchwood actor, Kai Owen) sexually abused her when she was 15 years old. Viewers will soon realise that Porsche told her mother, Reenie, at the time of the incident, but Pete convinced Reenie that Porsche's accusations were not true and that Porsche had propositioned him. A spokesperson for the soap explained: "The McQueen sisters [Porsche, Celine and Cleo] came to Hollyoaks to escape from an unhappy home life and the memory of Reenie's boyfriend Pete. The sisters had never confided in each other about Pete's inappropriate behaviour, which they had all experienced to varying degrees, so the extent of the danger he posed within the family was never revealed. When Pete comes back into their lives, troubled Reenie desperately wants him to stay and the girls want their mum to be in a happier place – but letting him into their home brings with it devastating consequences." Hollyoaks and child protection charity, the NSPCC have both been announced to offer support online over the course of the storyline and are set to promote a 'No Secrets' campaign, which will target to help youth find necessary help if they were to face a similar situation.

NSPCC lead for tackling sexual abuse, Jon Brown, spoke about the upcoming storyline and sexual abuse in children: "Well-researched storylines in soaps can help raise awareness of difficult and important issues, reaching millions of people and helping those affected reach out for support. Sexual abuse is a crime that rips apart families and I am very pleased with the way that Hollyoaks has thoughtfully approached an enormously emotive and challenging subject. Sexual abuse of children within families is disturbingly the most common form and the impact on victims is devastating, sometimes damaging them long into adulthood if they don't get the right support. Children can stay silent for fear of what speaking out will do to the relationships they have with other members of the family. Abusers may cynically use this fear to keep children silent, leaving them suffering a daily nightmare. Its important children know that help is out there and they can move forward positively." Hollyoaks executive producer, Bryan Kirkwood spoke about how viewers should be aware that Nana McQueen (Diane Langton) suffered sexual abuse within her family, and how the research that the Hollyoaks team did found that abuse can in fact infiltrate generations. He continued to speak about what he hopes to achieve: "Her daughter Reenie is as much the victim here as her daughters in that her own childhood was filled with such unclear boundaries that she is unable to spot the markers that mean her own girls are at risk. But this is not a hopeless story – far from it. It will endeavour to show that we do have the power to stop abuse and most importantly that it is possible to recover and to go on and have a happy and successful life. The campaign 'no secrets' is a simple message that can be used to encourage adults not to ask children to keep secrets and let children know that they shouldn't have secrets either. It is the secrets kept by generations of this family that have led to what we will see play out on screen this year." It was then revealed that Nana's ex-partner, Derek Clough (Bruce Montague), was her real father as Reenie was raped by him.

Porsche's final scenes were filmed on 12 November 2015, and were broadcast on 24 December 2015. However, Moore said that Porsche could return at some point in the future.

Celine McQueenCeline McQueen, played by Sarah George, made her first on screen appearance on 10 November 2014. The basis for the character was announced on 3 May 2014, whilst the character name and casting was announced on 26 August 2014. The character made a previously unannounced departure from the soap opera on 5 December 2016, when she was murdered by her ex-boyfriend, Cameron Campbell (Cameron Moore), becoming the fifth member of McQueen family to die on the show since Tina Reilly and Niall Rafferty in 2008, Carmel McQueen in 2014 and Phoebe McQueen and Gabriel McQueen in 2015. Celine is a nurse and is billed as being in touch with her spiritual side and nobody's fool.

Celine arrived for her sister Porsche McQueen's (Twinnie Lee Moore) wedding to Cameron's brother Lockie Campbell (Nick Rhys). She was on the train when it crashed, but was not badly injured. She and her cousin Theresa McQueen (Jorgie Porter) found Maxine Minniver (Nikki Sanderson) after the crash.

Following the train crash, Celine helps out and becomes a nurse at Dee Valley Hospital. She helps Jason Roscoe (Alfie Browne-Sykes) when he was admitted to hospital after collapsing, and discovers that he has body image issues. Celine confesses that she has battled body image issues since she was Jason's age, however, her advice falls upon deaf ears as Jason refuses to believe he has a problem. Celine also becomes attracted to Jason's older brother Ziggy Roscoe (Fabrizio Santino) and the pair go on a date, although Ziggy prefers Celine's colleague, Tegan Lomax (Jessica Ellis). Celine gets into trouble at the hospital when she takes the blame for Tegan performing a blood transfusion on her own daughter despite being a student nurse, but Tegan later admits the truth and Celine is cleared. Celine and Ziggy sleep together, and Tegan is heartbroken to discover them. Celine and Tegan eventually make up and Tegan confides in Celine when she discovers that her daughter, Rose, is not her biological daughter. Darren Osborne (Ashley Taylor Dawson) attempts to flirt with Celine, although she rejects his advances.

When treating Cameron Campbell (Cameron Moore) for an infection, Celine becomes attracted to him, and she is delighted when he asks her out on a date. However, Cameron is secretly still in love with Tegan's older sister, Leela (Kirsty-Leigh Porter), who is engaged to Ziggy. Cameron later asks Celine for help when he wants to make Leela jealous, and she reluctantly agrees. When this does not work and Leela does not seem jealous, Cameron and Celine sleep together. However, Cameron reads a text message on Celine's mobile phone which reveals that Ziggy and Tegan have feelings for each other, resulting in Cameron confronting Tegan the following day. Cameron later finishes with Celine completely. Celine is now a senior nurse after blackmailing Dr. Charles S'avage (Andrew Greenough). In April 2016, it is revealed that Celine attempted to kill Pete Buchanan (Kai Owen), who was thought to be a victim of serial killer Lindsey Butterfield (Sophie Austin). Celine is later pressured into marrying her aunt, Myra McQueen's (Nicole Barber-Lane) fiancé, Diego Salvador Martinez Hernandez De La Cruz (Juan Pablo Yepez), in an attempt for Diego's mother, Juanita (Jacey Sallés) to give the family £5 million. However, this ultimately ends Celine's blossoming romance with Jesse Donovan (Luke Jerdy). This stresses Celine immensely, as she feels guilty for lying to everybody she knows. On the day of the wedding, Myra declares her love for Diego in front of Juanita, ruining the scam, and so Celine declares her love for Jesse, and they begin a relationship.

Celine discovers that Cameron started the fire in the wooden maze at the "Halloween Spooktacular", which killed Nico Blake (Persephone Swales-Dawson) and Joe Roscoe (Ayden Callaghan), after viewing the footage on a video camera. Celine confronts Cameron, however he threatens her with the information he has about her attempting to murder Pete. Celine and Cameron both promise not to say anything. This causes Jesse to end their relationship because everyone believes that he started the fire. Celine is riddled with guilt and decides to tell the police what Cameron did. Desperate to keep the truth from being revealed, Cameron holds Celine hostage in the same shack where he had previously held Lockie captive. Cameron confronts a terrified Celine after he finds a voicemail from Jesse on her phone, leading to him believing that Celine has told Jesse that he started the fire. Cameron apologises to Celine for doing what he's about to do, she begs Cameron to let her go but he picks up some rope and tearfully murders Celine by strangling her to keep his involvement in the fire a secret. He then disposes of her corpse and her belongings. When Tegan and Cleo become suspicious, Cameron texts them from Celine's phone saying that she was going backpacking to "find herself" and that she would be abandoning all forms of technology. Celine's sister Cleo McQueen (Nadine Rose Mulkerrin) later sees that Cameron has given Celine's ring to Leela as an engagement ring; but believes Cameron's story that he bought it at the Emporium, and assumes Celine sold the ring to finance her travels.

In 2017, Cameron was arrested for a string of murders, include Celine's.

Minnie MinniverMinnie Minniver (also Blake)  is the daughter of Patrick Blake (Jeremy Sheffield) and Maxine Minniver (Nikki Sanderson). who was born with Down syndrome. Minnie was born during the "End of the Line" storyline. Maxine gave birth to Minnie in a shed when Maxine was worn out and Patrick decided to take Minnie away from Maxine. Straight after she was born, her parents fight the custody of her, for the revenge Patrick, he blackmails Darren Osborne (Ashley Taylor Dawson) to tell the judge that Maxine is an alcoholic. Patrick also puts a bottle filled with alcohol in her bag and she nearly loses custody of Minnie. In 2016 after the death of Patrick, after he was murdered by her niece Nico Blake (Persephone Swales-Dawson), Maxine finally took over custody. In April 2017, Minnie has an operation to have her tonsils removed. 

JJ RoscoeJoseph "JJ" Roscoe Jr. is the son of Joe Roscoe (Ayden Callaghan) and Lindsey Butterfield (Sophie Austin). He was born during the episode broadcast on 18 November 2014. During Lindsey's pregnancy with JJ, she is unaware of who JJ's father is as she had slept with both Joe and his brother, Freddie Roscoe (Charlie Clapham). It is later revealed, following a paternity test without Joe's knowledge, that Joe is JJ's biological father, upsetting Freddie. Lindsey and Freddie begin an affair, which is exposed on New Year's Eve 2014, with Joe and Lindsey's relationship ending as a result. Lindsey then goes on to marry Freddie in May 2015, which upsets Joe as he feels that Freddie is taking over his role as JJ's father. In 2016, Lindsey falls pregnant again, and is convinced that Joe is the father, however a scan reveals that she is actually four months pregnant, meaning that Freddie must be the baby's father. Lindsey is later exposed as the Gloved Hand Killer, and she is forced to leave JJ in Joe's care while she goes on the run. However, she soon joins forces with Silas Blissett (Jeff Rawle) in an attempt to kidnap JJ from Joe so he can be with Lindsey, manipulating Lindsey's sister Kim Butterfield (Daisy Wood-Davis) into helping them do so. Lindsey goes into labour, however, and she gives birth to a baby girl, Lexi, but she takes Lexi and flees to the Roscoe household, where Silas has Mercedes McQueen (Jennifer Metcalfe) hostage. After Mercedes revealed how Lindsey played Joe and Freddie off one another, Silas gives Lexi to Mercedes and murders Lindsey, leaving JJ and Lexi motherless. However, Mercedes and Joe begin a relationship and later become engaged, with Mercedes adopting both JJ and Lexi in the process. Unfortunately, in October 2016, Joe and Mercedes do not marry and Mercedes says an emotional goodbye to JJ and Lexi, before beginning a new life without Joe, JJ and Lexi in it. JJ becomes orphaned in November 2016 when Joe dies after falling from a ferris wheel and is being looked after by Mercedes and Freddie, although Joe and Freddie's mother Sandy Roscoe (Gillian Taylforth) wants him and Lexi to live with her in South Africa. In 2017, Sandy later call Mercedes that she is always welcoming to visit Joe's children anytime she wants.

D.S. Geoff ThorpeD.S. Geoff Thorpe, played by James Bradshaw, made his first appearance on 21 November 2014. He is introduced as a police officer who visits the McQueens after Phoebe McQueen (Mandip Gill) grows concerned about Mercedes McQueen's (Jennifer Metcalfe) disappearance. After blood is found at the house, he swiftly launches a murder investigation and later arrests Freddie Roscoe (Charlie Clapham). He releases him after Freddie is given a false alibi by Kim Butterfield (Daisy Wood-Davis). After Grace Black (Tamara Wall) falls off the balcony at The Loft, he questions Freddie over his involvement. He then goes to collect Grace's statement, and she corroborates with Freddie's story. After a car is found with Mercedes' blood in it, he goes to the Roscoes' garage, and causes Joe Roscoe (Ayden Callaghan) to become suspicious over Freddie. DS Thorpe later arrives at the Roscoes' house after Myra McQueen (Nicole Barber-Lane) finds out Freddie is leaving. DS Thorpe follows Freddie to where he is going and finds him with Lindsey Butterfield (Sophie Austin). After Joe files a complaint for harassment, DS Thorpe posts him the picture showing Freddie and Lindsey kissing, however, he reveals this to Freddie before Joe can read the letter.

On New Year's Day 2015, he arrests Joe on suspicion of murder after Rick Spencer (Victor Gardener) is killed. He releases Joe when there is not enough evidence to hold him, but re-arrests him after Nancy Osborne (Jessica Fox) comes forward with a false testimony. DS Thorpe later gets Porsche McQueen (Twinnie Lee Moore) and Myra to view some CCTV footage to see if Mercedes had been found, he was disheartened when Myra didn't identify the lady as her daughter. DS Thorpe tells Porsche that he will not take further action until a murder weapon has been found. After Kim retracts her alibi he goes to arrest Freddie, but is unable to get any conclusive evidence. He later arrests Freddie after he is found standing over the unconscious body of a witness. However, after the witness disappears he has to release Freddie again. He asks the McQueens to identify some jewelry after a body is found, but it is found not be Mercedes' body. He searches Freddie's apartment after Mercedes' diary is found, and finds a bloodied shirt belonging to Freddie. DS Thorpe tracks down Freddie and Lindsey after they flee, but when he arrives at their hotel he finds them gone. He later tries to catch Freddie again after Lindsey says where he is, but he is unsuccessful. He interviews Lindsey and Joe after Lindsey sees Grace video calling Mercedes, but Grave convinces Thorpe otherwise. He and Kim trail Lindsey after Kim suspects that she's meeting up with Freddie, but Lindsey manages to avoid them, when Kim thinks she's found another hint to where Freddie is, DS Thorpe rejects it.

DS Thorpe is present at the Roscoes' house when Kim reveals that Freddie will go back there, but he leaves after Freddie doesn't show up. After Lindsey plants evidence at the McQueen household, DS Thorpe questions Phoebe over the murder and later charges her with it. Sinead O'Connor (Stephanie Davis) later approaches DS Thorpe and tells him that she believes that Grace committed the crime after she is threatened by her. DS Thorpe arrests Grace after he listens to a recorded conversation between her and Sinead which leads him to believe that she committed the crime. When Mercedes is taken back to England, she is interviewed by DS Thorpe over her disappearance. He later takes a statement from Joe after he is assaulted, as well as interviewing Tegan Lomax (Jessica Ellis) after her daughter, Rose, is kidnapped. He releases Tony Hutchinson (Nick Pickard) after he is arrested and arranges a press conference, where Tony reveals that his wife Diane Hutchinson (Alex Fletcher) had borrowed his car which leads to DS Thorpe arresting her. He later arrests Tegan for perverting the course of justice when it is discovered that she was in possession of Rose. DS Thorpe speaks at her court hearing and reveals that she was planning on fleeing the country with Rose and Ziggy Roscoe (Fabrizio Santino).

He arrests Nico Blake (Persephone Swales-Dawson) and Trevor Royle (Greg Wood) in relation to the murder of Carly Bradley (Sophie Wise). He later investigates the Gloved Hand Killer after Cindy Savage (Stephanie Waring) alerts him to it. DS Thorpe also shows up to arrest Trevor, after the body of Freddie is found in his boot, but he notices Freddie's hand moving. DS Thorpe, Ben Bradley (Ben Richards) and Jason Roscoe (Alfie Browne-Sykes) all did an open appeal at the hospital saying that they believe the cardiac arrest deaths are linked and they later are later led to believe that Trevor is responsible. During Freddie's "funeral", DS Thorpe takes a phonecall from Freddie and tells him that nobody suspects anything, making DS Thorpe the only person aware that Freddie, is in fact, still alive. On New Year's Eve, DS Thorpe tracks Freddie down in Brighton and informs him that his brother, Ziggy, has died. Freddie is desperate to return to the village to support his family, however DS Thorpe convinces him to stay away until Trevor is convicted. However, in February 2016, Lindsey – the real Gloved Hand Killer – frames Kim for the murders and attempted murders, so DS Thorpe arrests Kim. When Sienna Blake (Anna Passey) is stabbed, he investigates the crime and is convinced either Trevor or Grace committed it, unaware that it was in fact Sienna's daughter, Nico.

In April 2016, when Simone (Jacqueline Boatswain) and Louis Loveday (Karl Collins) discover that Sonia Albright (Kiza Deen) imposed as their missing daughter Lisa Loveday (Rachel Adedeji), DS Thorpe leads an investigation into Joanne Cardsley (Rachel Leskovac) about the disappearance of Lisa. He then arrests Sonia for imposing as Lisa. DS Thorpe then arrests Margaret Smith (Suzette Llewellyn), Joanne's friend, for kidnapping Lisa. In May 2016, DS Thorpe leads the investigation into finding Lindsey, who becomes fugitive after it is revealed that she is the Gloved Hand Killer. He sends a PCSO to guard the Roscoe household while he and police force search for her. After catching Lindsey and realising that she has been murdered herself by Silas Blissett (Jeff Rawle), closing the Gloved Hand Killer case, DS Thorpe sets his sights onto Ben when Trevor is mysteriously stabbed and killed before his wedding. Sienna, who was having an affair with Trevor but married Ben, informs DS Thorpe it was her daughter Nico who killed Trevor. DS Thorpe refuses to believe that a teenage girl could murder such a well-known gangster. Nico admits to Ben that she killed Trevor but in an attempt to spare her of punishment, Ben lies to DS Thorpe that he killed Trevor and is arrested. Nico continues to scheme through the village, when she blackmails Maxine Minniver (Nikki Sanderson). Nico sends a video of her grandfather Patrick Blake (Jeremy Sheffield) expressing his false concerns that Maxine is trying to kill him to DS Thorpe. DS Thorpe investigates this and attempts to intimidate Maxine into confessing. DS Thorpe then believes that Maxine's ex-boyfriend Darren Osborne (Ashley Taylor Dawson) is involved in the disappearance of Patrick, and has a drink with Darren's father, Jack Osborne (Jimmy McKenna), to intimidate Darren. DS Thorpe later arrests and questions solicitor James Nightingale (Gregory Finnegan) after Ste Hay (Kieron Richardson) states that James kidnapped his boyfriend Harry Thompson (Parry Glasspool). DS Thorpe and DS Gavin Armstrong (Andrew Hayden-Smith) then convince Patrick's daughter, Sienna, to help them get Maxine to confess to killing Patrick. DS Armstrong and DS Thorpe eventually get criminal Warren Fox (Jamie Lomas) to help Sienna and pose as Mike Jones to gain Maxine's trust and find out if she killed Patrick. Warren finds out that Maxine hid Patrick's body in the city wall. When DS Armstrong and DS Thorpe investigate, they find that the body had been moved. However, the body is later found in the woods by Nico and Peri Lomax (Ruby O'Donnell), so DS Thorpe and DS Armstrong open an investigation there.

DS Thorpe's nephew Ryan Knight (Duncan James) moves to Hollyoaks with his fiancée Amy Barnes (Ashley Slanina-Davies) and her children to Ste. After a custody battle between Amy and Ste, Ryan believes that Ste reported Amy to Social Services after a video went viral online which looked like Amy was mistreating her daughter, Leah Barnes (Ela-May Demircan). It is revealed that Ste's boyfriend, Harry, who reported her. After DS Thorpe tells Ryan where the phonecall came from, Ryan savagely attacks Ste until Harry admits that he was responsible. DS Thorpe is later forced to give Ryan an alibi when Ste reports him to the police. In January 2017, DS Thorpe investigates the murder of DI Eva Falco (Kerry Bennett), who Grace shot dead on a train. Grace gets an alibi from her half-brother, Adam Donovan (Jimmy Essex), although Grace's other half-brother and Eva's boyfriend Liam Donovan (Maxim Baldry), does not believe his siblings and works with DS Thorpe to gain Grace's trust and get a confession from her. DS Thorpe later reveals to a distraught Liam that Eva was pregnant with his child when she was murdered, hoping that Liam would become more determined to bring Grace down. Liam tries to encourage Grace to do a deal with Shane Sweeney (Lanre Malaolu) where she will swap some of The Loft's cash notes with fake ones. Grace lies to Liam she will do it, but she throws the money away as she is suspicious about Liam's behaviour. As Liam has told DS Thorpe that the deal is on, DS Thorpe and the police turn up at The Loft, but don't find anything. After more help from Liam, DS Thorpe arrests Grace for the murder of Darcy Wilde (Aisling Jarrett-Gavin), Adam's fiancé who has been presumed dead for several years. Grace continues to state that she did not murder Darcy or Eva, and is forced to go on the run. Eventually Thorpe finds Grace but then has to release her when it turns out Darcy was never dead after all.

In March 2017, DS Thorpe appears as Ryan's best man when he marries Amy. He later supports Ryan when Amy is found dead after being murdered by an unknown assailant. DS Thorpe later appears at his own birthday party held at The Dog in the Pond public house, attended by Ryan and Mercedes. Mercedes threatens to expose the fact that Ryan was having sex with Kyle Kelly (Adam Rickitt) at the time that Amy was murdered to DS Thorpe, but she changes her mind upon seeing Amy's children. He later investigates a robbery at the Lovedays, where Simone's jewellery has been stolen. He searches the McQueens, and arrests Prince McQueen (Malique Thompson-Dwyer) on suspicion of committing the robbery. However, in order to protect Prince, his mother Goldie McQueen (Chelsee Healey) confesses to robbing the Lovedays.

In March 2018, DS Thorpe discovers that Ryan was in fact the culprit who murdered Amy. However, Ryan later murders DS Thorpe by strangling him.

ShaneShane', played by Jody Latham made his first on screen appearance on 24 November 2014. The character and casting was announced on 31 October 2014. Shane arrives after Cameron Campbell (Cameron Moore) receives money from his brother Lockie (Nick Rhys) from Shane. Shane turns up outside the Lomax house eager to buy their house from Leela Lomax (Kirsty-Leigh Porter) and acts strangely around her and Tegan Lomax (Jessica Ellis). He then meets Cameron at Tony Hutchinson (Nick Pickard) and Diane O'Connor's (Alex Fletcher) wedding telling him he wants his money back as he knows information about the armed robbery he helped him with when he was younger. He then meets Cameron's teenage daughter Peri Lomax (Ruby O'Donnell) at her school so she can give Cameron a letter sent from him. Peri tells Cameron and he threatens Shane who tells him that something bad will happen if he doesn't get him his money. Cameron, who wants to keep the money so he can afford to keep the house, only gives him £1,000 out the money which angers Shane who threatens Cameron but Cameron pushes him and warns him how dangerous he is as he secretly killed Sam (Lizzie Roper) and Danny Lomax (Stephen Billington). Shane then takes the £1,000 and leaves for good leaving Cameron's to get on with his life with his family.

Other characters

References

External links
Characters and cast at Channel 4 
Blessing Chambers at Channel 4
Rick Spencer at Channel 4
Nico Blake at Channel 4

, Hollyoaks
2014